KF Shkëndija Haraçinë is a football club based in the village of Aračinovo, Skopje, North Macedonia. They currently competing in the OFS Gazi Baba league.

History
The club was founded in 1977.

Honours
 Macedonian Second League:
Runners-up (1): 1994–95
Third place (1): 1995–96

References

External links
Shkëndija Haraçinë Facebook 
Club info at MacedonianFootball 
Football Federation of Macedonia 

Skendija Aracinovo
Association football clubs established in 1977
1977 establishments in the Socialist Republic of Macedonia
FK
Shkëndija Aračinovo